Cyperus fuscus is a species of sedge known by the common name brown galingale, or brown flatsedge. This plant is native to much of Europe, Asia and North Africa from England, Portugal and Morocco east to China and Thailand. It is an introduced species in North America, where it is naturalized in widely scattered locations in the United States and Canada.

Cyperus fuscusis a plant of wet areas, particularly disturbed places such as ditches and temporary ponds. It is an annual herb with paper-thin stems reaching 30 centimeters in maximum height. There may be short, flat leaves about the base of the plant. The inflorescence contains three to 15 spikelets, which are flat, oval or rectangular, and dark brown to deep purple. Each spikelet has around ten flowers enclosed in dark bracts. The fruit is a light brown achene about a millimeter long. In the UK, Cyperus fuscus is one of 101 species named as a priority for conservation by the conservation charity Plantlife.

References

External links
Jepson Manual Treatment
USDA Plants Profile
Photo gallery
Cyperus fuscus Species listing page.

fuscus
Plants described in 1753
Taxa named by Carl Linnaeus
Flora of Europe
Flora of Asia
Flora of North Africa